Parya is an isolated Central Indo-Aryan language spoken in the border region between Tajikistan and Uzbekistan. There are several thousand speakers worldwide.

Classification and Status 
Parya is classified as a Central Zone language in the Indo-Aryan language family. 

Tajuzbeki (or Tadj-Uzbeki) was an alternative name coined by Bholanath Tiwari for the same language. Much of the academic research in documenting and characterizing Parya was done by prominent Soviet linguist I. M. Oranski. The language may also be referred to as Afgana-Yi Nasfurush, Afghana-Yi Siyarui, Changgars, Laghmani, or Pbharya. 

SIL estimates that there may be between 2,500 and 7,500 speakers. 

The language is not officially recognized or used in schools and is categorized as severely endangered.

Speakers of Parya 
Parya is spoken in the Hissor Valley of Tajikistan, west of Dushanbe, and the adjacent Surkhondaryo basin of Uzbekistan, including the towns of Hisor, Shahrinav, Regar/Tursunzoda, Surchi, Afghonobod, Qalai Hisor, Pravda Vostok, Boloi Kanal, and Kolkhozi Leninism.

The language is mostly spoken with ones family and relations, and it is almost always spoken in the homes of native speakers.

Parya speakers tend to be bilingual in the dominant languages surrounding them, but tend to exclusively use Parya at home. 

The Tajik language has increasingly influenced the Parya language.

Phonology

Grammar

Vigesimal counting 
Parya employs some vigesimal numeral counting patterns.

References

External links 
 The Indo-Aryan languages - a tour
 Parya numerals

Indo-Aryan languages
Languages of Uzbekistan
Languages of Tajikistan
Hindi languages